SM U-119 was one of the 329 submarines serving in the Imperial German Navy in World War I.
U-119 was engaged in the naval warfare and took part in the First Battle of the Atlantic.

Design
German Type UE II submarines were preceded by the shorter Type UE I submarines. U-119 had a displacement of  when at the surface and  while submerged. The submarine was powered by two  engines for use while surfaced, and two  engines for use while submerged. She had two shafts and two  propellers.

U-119 was fitted with four  torpedo tubes (fitted at its bow), fourteen torpedoes, two  mine chutes (fitted at its stern), forty-two mines, one  SK L/45 deck gun, and 494 rounds. She had a complement of forty (thirty-six crew members and four officers).

References

Notes

Citations

Bibliography

German Type UE II submarines
U-boats commissioned in 1918
World War I submarines of Germany
1918 ships